Carl Anthony Brasseaux (pseudonym: Antoine Bourque; born August 19, 1951) is an American historian and educator. He specialized in French Colonial North America, particularly of Louisiana and the Cajun people. He helped to pioneer the field of Cajun history, and his published works on this topic represent the first serious, in-depth examination of the history of the ethnic group.

He taught at  University of Louisiana at Lafayette, from 1975 until 2010.

Early life and education
Brasseaux was born on August 19, 1951 in Opelousas, the seat of St. Landry Parish, in southern Louisiana. He is Cajun and grew up in the town of Sunset, Louisiana.

He received both his Bachelor of Arts and Master of Arts degrees from the University of Louisiana at Lafayette (then named the University of Southwestern Louisiana). He obtained his doctorate in North American studies at the Paris Diderot University.

Career
Brasseaux served at the University of Louisiana at Lafayette from 1975 until 2010; where his roles at the university included the assistant director of Center for Cultural and Eco-Tourism, from 1975 to 2001, and as director from 2001 to 2010; as the curator of colonial records collection from 1980 to 2010; an adjunct assistant professor from 1987 to 1990; assistant professor from 1990 to 1998; and a professor of history from 1998 to 2010.

At the Center for Louisiana Studies, Brasseaux was involved with Louisiana Digital Folklore Archive. This large collection includes the Center for Acadian and Creole Folklore, which is regarded as the largest compilation of media resources pertaining to these two south Louisiana ethnic groups.

Awards and honors 
In 1991, the French government awarded Brasseaux the title of Chevalier in the Order des Palmes Académiques, an honor reserved for those whose scholarly pursuits are deemed to contribute significantly to French culture.

Brasseaux received the 2003 Louisiana Writer Award for his enduring contribution to the "literary intellectual heritage of Louisiana." The award was presented to him by then Lieutenant Governor Kathleen Blanco, on November 8, 2003, at a ceremony held at the 2nd annual Louisiana Book Festival in Baton Rouge.

Bibliography 
Brasseaux has published more than 30 books, many of which are history-related and he has written fiction under the pseudonym Antoine Bourque, including:

See also
 Center for Louisiana Studies

References

External links
Center for Cultural and Eco-Tourism
Historical Background of the Center for Acadian and Creole Folklore

1951 births
21st-century American historians
21st-century American male writers
Living people
Cajun people
Acadian history
University of Louisiana at Lafayette alumni
University of Louisiana at Lafayette faculty
Paris Diderot University alumni
People from Opelousas, Louisiana
Writers from Lafayette, Louisiana
People from Sunset, Louisiana
Historians from Louisiana
American male non-fiction writers